"I Don't Want Your Love" is the seventeenth single from Duran Duran and the first single from the Big Thing album. It was released in September 1988. As with the album, the band's name was rendered on the artwork as Duranduran.

Cash Box called it "a serviceable single" with "a funky bass and percussive counterpoint" and "more of a mixed vocal arrangement, relying less on [Simon] Lebon's strained style."

Music video

The video features the band in a raucous courtroom filled with spectators and tabloid reporters, "testifying" by singing the song into the court's witness microphones. The instrumental bridge in the song is accompanied by images of a young man and woman dancing or fighting (or both).

The other musicians in the video are guitarist Warren Cuccurullo (playing Kamen's guitar part) and David Palmer, former drummer for ABC.

B-sides, bonus tracks and remixes
The single version of "I Don't Want Your Love" was a remix by Shep Pettibone. It was backed by the album version for the b-side.

A UK promo 12" includes the Dub mix of "I Don't Want Your Love", which was unreleased elsewhere until 1999's Strange Behaviour remix collection (which strangely didn't use the lead 12" mix entitled "Big Mix").

Formats and track listing

7": EMI. / YOUR 1 United Kingdom 
 "I Don't Want Your Love" (7" mix) - 3:47
 "I Don't Want Your Love" (Album Version) - 4:06
 Track 1: additional production and mix by Shep Pettibone.

12": EMI / 12 YOUR 1 United Kingdom 
 "I Don't Want Your Love" (Big mix) - 7:33
 "I Don't Want Your Love" (Album Version) - 4:05
 "I Don't Want Your Love" (7" mix) - 3:47
 Track 3: additional production and mix by Shep Pettibone.
 Also available on CD (CD YOUR 1)

12": EMI / 12 YOUR DJ 1 (Promo) United Kingdom 
 "I Don't Want Your Love" (Big mix) - 7:35
 "I Don't Want Your Love" (Dub mix) - 7:36

7": Capitol Records. / B-44237 United States 
 "I Don't Want Your Love" (Big And 7 Inch Mix) - 3:47
 "I Don't Want Your Love" (Album Version) - 4:05
 Track 1: additional production and mix by Shep Pettibone.

12": Capitol Records. / V-15417 United States 
 "I Don't Want Your Love" (Big Mix) - 7:35
 "I Don't Want Your Love" (Album Version) - 4:05
 "I Don't Want Your Love" (7" Mix) - 3:47
 Track 3: additional production and mix by Shep Pettibone.

CD: Part of "Singles Box Set 1986-1995" boxset 
 "I Don't Want Your Love" (7" Mix) - 3:47
 I Don't Want Your Love" (Album Version) - 4:05
 "I Don't Want Your Love" (Big Mix) - 7:35

Chart positions
"I Don't Want Your Love"  debuted at number 20  and peaked the following week at number 14 in the UK, but did much better in the rest of Europe, especially in Italy where it spent six non-consecutive weeks at number 1, and was the best-selling single of 1988 in that country. It also did very well in the U.S., reaching number 4 on the Billboard Hot 100, and number 1 on the Billboard Hot Dance Club Play.

 # 14 UK Singles Chart
 # 4  Billboard Hot 100
 # 13 Billboard Modern Rock Tracks 	
 # 1  Billboard Hot Dance Club Play
 # 15 Top 30 (Belgium)
 # 16 Dutch Top 40
 # 1  Italy
 # 8  Canadian CHUM Chart
 # 15 Swiss Top 30

Year-end charts

Other appearances
Aside from the single, "I Don't Want Your Love" has appeared on:

 Big Thing (1988)
 Decade: Greatest Hits (1989)
 Greatest (1998)

Personnel
Duran Duran are:
Simon Le Bon – Vocals
John Taylor – Bass
Nick Rhodes – Keyboards

With:
Steve Ferrone – Live Drums
Marc Chantereau – Percussion
Warren Cuccurullo – Rhythm Guitar
Chester Kamen – Noise Guitar, Rhythm Guitar
Stan Harrison – Saxophone
Patrick Bourgoin – Saxophone
Mac Gollehon – Trumpet
Joniece Jamison – Backing Vocals
Carole Fredericks – Backing Vocals

Production:
 Duran Duran – Producer
 Jonathan Elias – Producer
 Daniel Abraham – Producer
 Shep Pettibone – Remixer
 Bob Rosa – Remix engineer

External links
 TM's Duran Duran Discography

References

1988 singles
Songs written by Simon Le Bon
Songs written by John Taylor (bass guitarist)
Songs written by Nick Rhodes
Duran Duran songs
Number-one singles in Italy
Freestyle music songs
1987 songs